The  Lydia  is a wrecked whaling ship located below the foot of King Street in San Francisco, California. The ship was built in 1840 and wrecked in 1907. San Francisco was later built up over the site of the wreck, and it was not rediscovered until a sewer construction project unearthed the remains in 1980. The shipwreck included an intact case of twenty-four bottles of ginger beer brewed by A.S. Watson & Co. The shipwreck was added to the National Register of Historic Places in 1981, and a plaque marking the site was placed in 2005.

References

External links

Shipwreck of Whaling Bark Lydia at NoeHill

Shipwrecks on the National Register of Historic Places in California
1840 ships
National Register of Historic Places in San Francisco
Whaling in the United States